Veersen Aanandrao alias Baba Kadam was a Marathi novelist famous for his detective novels. During his career his wrote over 50 novels, most notably, Bhalu, Panch, and Najuk Bote.

Personal life

Early life 
Born in Kolhapur he did his schooling from Vidyapeeth High School, Kolhapur and after graduation from the Chhatrapati Rajaram College he studied law.

Professional life 
As a law graduate he worked as a police prosecutor. While working as a police prosecutor he experienced number of human incidents related to humorous side, which he penned down his experiences in the court and he became popular as a novelist. His work also gave him a deep knowledge of different police laws such as the IPC and the  CrPC.

References

 Baba Kadam books Open Library

Indian male novelists
1933 births
2009 deaths
People from Kolhapur
Marathi-language writers
Indian crime fiction writers
Novelists from Maharashtra
20th-century Indian lawyers
20th-century Indian novelists
20th-century Indian male writers
20th-century pseudonymous writers